Woking Football Club is an English football club based in Woking, Surrey, formed in 1889.
The club plays at Kingfield Stadium and participates in the National League, the fifth tier of English football.

Woking have won the FA Trophy a joint-record 3 times and finished the Conference National 2014–15 season in 7th place. Woking are known as The Cards or The Cardinals.

History

Key

Seasons

Woking deducted 3 points
|- align="center"
| 2020–21
| National League
| 5
| 42
| 8
| 9
| 25
| 42
| 69
| -27
| 33
| 20 of 24

References

English football club seasons
Seasons